Emil Hedvall (born 9 June 1983) is a retired Swedish footballer who plays as a goalkeeper.

He holds the record of most consecutives games on the bench in Allsvenskan without getting any playing time. After 119 straight games on the bench he finally got to start for Gefle IF in the first round of the 2013 Allsvenskan when Mattias Hugosson was out with a fever. He has also played for IK Brage, Forssa BK, Gagnefs IF, Gestrike-Hammarby IF and Söderhamns FF.
In August 2017, Hedvall signed as an emergency back-up for Östersunds FK.

References

External links

 (archive)

1983 births
Living people
Association football goalkeepers
Gefle IF players
Allsvenskan players
Swedish footballers
Sweden youth international footballers
Forssa BK players